Lobos is the partido capital of Lobos Partido in Buenos Aires Province, Argentina.

Lobos or LOBOS may also refer to:

Places
Lobos Creek, a stream in San Francisco, California
Lobos Island, an island of the Canary Islands
Lobos Partido, a partido of Buenos Aires Province, Argentina
Isla de Lobos, an island southeast of Punta del Este, Maldonado department, Uruguay
Isla de Lobos, an island at the confluence of Uruguay and Negro rivers, Rio Negro department, Uruguay

Other uses
LOBOS, a software program
Lobos de la BUAP, a Mexican football club
New Mexico Lobos, the athletic teams representing the University of New Mexico
Lender option borrower options, a UK financial product
Portugal national rugby union team, nicknamed Os Lobos (The Wolves)

People with the surname
Eduardo Lobos (born 1981), Chilean footballer
Frank Lobos, a Chilean former football player
Franklin Lobos (born 1957), Chilean footballer
Lucas Lobos, Argentine footballer
Themo Lobos, Chilean comic book writer

See also
 Lobo (disambiguation)
 Los Lobos (disambiguation)